Going Down Fast is a 1969 novel by Marge Piercy. It tells the story of Anna, a woman living with multiple losses; Rowley, a blue-eyed soul singer; Leon, an underground film-maker; and Caroline, a woman with a dark secret. They all live in an area of an unnamed city where a swathe of blocks are being demolished to make way for a university.

Reception
A New York Times book review said that "Piercy burns anger and conviction".

External links
 "Marge Piercy Papers (1958-2004, bulk 1966-2003)." University of Michigan.
 "Piercy, Marge 1936-." Encyclopedia.com.

1969 American novels
Novels by Marge Piercy
1969 debut novels